The 2006–07 FA Women's Premier League Cup was the 16th staging of the FA Women's Premier League Cup, a knockout competition for England's top 36 women's football clubs.

The tournament was won by Arsenal L.F.C., who beat Leeds United Women F.C. 1–0 in the final.

References

Prem
FA Women's National League Cup